Hani Kandu is the channel in between Kaafu Atoll Gaafaru and North Male' Atoll of the Maldives.

References
 Divehiraajjege Jōgrafīge Vanavaru. Muhammadu Ibrahim Lutfee. G.Sōsanī.

Channels of the Maldives
Channels of the Indian Ocean